Masha is a town in south-western Ethiopia. Masha had been the administrative center of the Sheka Zone until 1996 when that Zone was combined with the Keffa Zone to create the Kaficho Shekacho Zone, when it was demoted to the administrative center of only the Masha Anderacha woreda. When the two former Zones were re-created towards the end of 2000, Masha once again became the capital of the restored Sheka Zone.

According to the SNNPR's Bureau of Finance and Economic Development,  Masha's amenities include electrical service provided by a diesel generator, a bank, and a branch of one of the local microfinance organizations.

Demographics 
Based on figures from the Central Statistical Agency in 2005, Masha has an estimated total population of 11,122 of whom 5,393 are men and 5,729 are women. The 1994 national census reported this town had a total population of 6,138 of whom 2,986 were men and 3,152 were women.

References 

Populated places in the Southern Nations, Nationalities, and Peoples' Region